Oswald Jean-Baptiste Michel Augustin Bouteille (13 November 1825 – 21 July 1893) was a French lawyer and politician who was a Deputy of Basses-Alpes from 1876 to 1881, and Senator of Basses-Alpes from 1885 to 1893.

Birth and early career

Oswald Jean-Baptiste Michel Augustin Bouteille was born on 13 November 1825 in Manosque, Basses-Alpes (now called Alpes-de-Haute-Provence).
He became an advocate in Manosque.
During the Second French Empire he was appointed mayor of Manosque and was elected to the Basses-Alpes General Council, where he was vice-president.
During the French Third Republic his first attempt to be elected to the senate was defeated.

Deputy

On 5 March 1876 Bouteille was elected Deputy of Basses-Alpes for the Forcalquier constituency by 4,339 votes against 4,329 for his Conservative opponent, M. de Salve.
He sat with the moderate left, and was one of the 363.
He was reelected on 14 October 1877 by 4,909 votes against 4,486 for M. de Salve, the government candidate.
He votes with the Opportunist Republicans, votes against invalidating the deputies of the right, for Article 7, for application of the existing laws of congregations, for the partial amnesty, for invalidation of the elections of Louis Auguste Blanqui and for divorce.
He was reelected on 21 August 1881 by 6,050 votes out of 6,400.
He supported the policy of Jules Ferry, approved the Tonkin Campaign and rejected repeal of the Concordat of 1801.
He left office on 5 February 1885.

Senator

Bouteille was Senator of Basses-Alpes from 25 January 1885 to 21 July 1893.
He was elected in the 1885 triennial renewal of the Senate as the second of two senators for Basses-Alpes by 254 votes against 151 for Joseph Eugène Michel, the outgoing senator.
He sat with the majority in the Senate, voted for the new military law, and in 1889 spoke for reinstatement of the uninomial ballot, for the draft Lisbonne law restricting freedom of the press and for the process to be followed against General Boulanger.
From 1889 to 1893 he belonged to several committees, but did not make any speeches in the Senate.
Jean-Baptiste Bouteille died in office on 21 July 1893 in Manosque, Basses-Alpes.

Notes

Sources

1825 births
1893 deaths
People from Manosque
Politicians from Provence-Alpes-Côte d'Azur
Opportunist Republicans
Members of the 1st Chamber of Deputies of the French Third Republic
Members of the 2nd Chamber of Deputies of the French Third Republic
Members of the 3rd Chamber of Deputies of the French Third Republic
French Senators of the Third Republic
Senators of Alpes-de-Haute-Provence